Islam Khusiyevich Chesnokov (born 21 November 1999) is a Kazakhstani footballer currently playing as a forward for Kazakh club Tobol.

Career statistics

Club

Notes

References

External links
 

1999 births
Living people
Kazakhstani footballers
Association football forwards
Kazakhstani expatriate footballers
Expatriate footballers in Belarus
Kazakhstan Premier League players
Belarusian First League players
FC Altai Semey players
FC Belshina Bobruisk players
FC Tobol players